Hotel ratings are often used to classify hotels according to their quality. From the initial purpose of informing travellers on basic facilities that can be expected, the objectives of hotel rating have expanded into a focus on the hotel experience as a whole. Today the terms 'grading', 'rating', and 'classification' are used to generally refer to the same concept, that is to categorize hotels.

There is a wide variety of  rating schemes used by different organizations around the world. Many have a system involving stars, with a greater number of stars indicating greater luxury. Forbes Travel Guide, formerly Mobil Travel Guide, launched its star rating system in 1958. The AAA and their affiliated bodies use diamonds instead of stars to express hotel and restaurant ratings levels.

Food services, entertainment, view, room variations such as size and additional amenities, spas and fitness centers, ease of access and location may be considered in establishing a standard. Hotels are independently assessed in traditional systems and rest heavily on the facilities provided. Some consider this disadvantageous to smaller hotels whose quality of accommodation could fall into one class but the lack of an item such as an elevator would prevent it from reaching a higher categorization.

Standards of hotel classification 

The more common classification systems include "monkey" rating, letter grading, from "A" to "F", such as hotels and motels. Systems using terms such as Deluxe/Luxury, First Class/Superior, Tourist Class/Standard, and Budget Class/Economy are more widely accepted as hotel types, rather than hotel standard.

Some countries have rating by a single public standard; Belgium, Denmark, Greece, Italy, Malta, Netherlands, Portugal, Spain and Hungary all have laws defining the hotel rating. In Germany, Austria and Switzerland, the rating is defined by the respective hotel industry association using a five-star system.

The classifications are:

Tourist (★) |
Standard (★★) |
Comfort (★★★) |
First Class (★★★★) |
Luxury (★★★★★)

The "Superior" mark is to flag extras beyond the minimum defined in the standard, but not enough to move the hotel up to the next tier ranking.

The Swiss hotel rating was the first non-government formal hotel classification beginning in 1979. It influenced the hotel classification in Austria and Germany. The formal hotel classification of the DEHOGA (German Hotel and Restaurant Association) started on 1 August 1996 and proved successful with 80% of guests citing the hotel stars as the main criteria in hotel selection. This implementation influenced the creation of a common European Hotelstars rating system that started in 2010 (see below).

In France, the rating is defined by the public tourist board (Atout France) using a four-star system (plus "L" for Luxus), which has changed to a five-star system from 2009 on. In South Africa, the Tourist Grading Council of South Africa has strict rules for a hotel types granting up to 5 stars. In India, the classification of hotels is based on two categories such as "Star" and "Heritage". Hotels in India are classified by Hotel and Restaurant Association Classification Committee (HRACC), Ministry of Tourism, India. In New Zealand, hotels and other tourism services are graded by Qualmark, which is owned by Tourism New Zealand, a government organisation.

Hotel classifications by country

Australia  
In Australia, the industry accommodation rating scheme and Star Rating trademarks, known as Star Ratings Australia, are owned by the Australian Tourism Industry Council. A Star Rating represents the quality and condition of guest facilities which is determined by 200 criteria. Star Ratings are awarded to hotels, motels, serviced apartments, self-catering, hosted accommodation and caravan-holiday parks. The scheme uses physical visits, reviews and mystery guest stays to make their accreditation on the accommodation's ratings.

Australia's star ratings have been operating since the 1950s as both an accreditation as well as a booking service. It was first owned by the state based automobile clubs including NRMA, RACV, RACQ, RAC, RAA and RACT. It was then organized by the Australian Automobile Association Tourism (AAA Tourism) as a peak body. However, the booking service in the motoring clubs was not continued and later the annual accommodation guide book ceased to be printed with the accommodation guide going online. AAA Tourism closed in 2013, but Star Ratings Australia continued as an inspection and star rating service only, as well as an accommodation website.

In 2015 Star Ratings Australia became one of the first independent accommodation classification systems in the world to incorporate a consumer 'voice'. Their website also shows a Travellers' Rating which is presented in parallel to the independent Star Rating and is an aggregate of past guest ratings and reviews from more than 100 websites in 45 different languages. The rating is shown as a 10 point score. Weighting applies to the popularity of the source site and the date of the last guest review. The William Angliss Institute in Melbourne developed an independent benchmarking framework to show if a property has met or exceeded guest expectations.

On 28 February 2017, Michael Reed, CEO of Australian Motoring Services, advised clients of the closure of Star Ratings Australia brand and asked to remove star rating and automobile club logos from their accommodation and promotional information by June 2017. It was said that competition from online travel agencies such as TripAdvisor and their customer rating system led to its demise.

The brand was then transferred to the Australian Tourism Industry Council. In early 2019, Star Ratings were rebranded under the council's "Quality Tourism" Accreditation Program.

Star Ratings in Australia stand for independently reviewed quality standards and are defined as such:

United Kingdom 
In the United Kingdom hotels are rated from one star to five stars. The RAC pulled out of accommodation grading in 2008 so the only grading schemes in operation are those operated by the AA (Automobile Association) and the national tourist boards: Visit England, Visit Wales, the Scottish Tourist Board and the Northern Ireland Tourist Board. The schemes were all 'harmonised' to ensure consistency between the schemes. This applies to all accommodation types apart from self-catering that the AA started offering in 2009. The AA criteria are available on its website. In addition to the usual black stars (ranging from one (the lowest) to five (the highest), the AA awards red stars to the highest-rated, which are deemed 'Inspectors' Choice'. Each of the national tourist boards have grading explanations on their web sites.

Philippines 
In the Philippines, the Department of Tourism has an accreditation system for hotels, apartment hotels and resorts. The current system which uses a "star system" which rates establishments from 1 to 5 stars was adopted in 2012. The rating of the aforementioned facilities are determined through a points system. Hotels, apartment hotels, and resorts are graded according to their service, facility quality and condition, and business practices. The Department of Tourism classifies the criteria used into seven dimensions or "business area" namely: Arrival & Departure, Public Areas, Bedrooms, Food & Beverage, Lounge Area, Kitchen Area, Amenities, and Business Practices, all common to the three categories except Kitchen and Lounge Area which is only applicable to apartment hotels. 1,000 points is the maximum number of points an establishment can attain.

European Hotelstars Union 
The HOTREC (Hotels, Restaurants & Cafés in Europe) is an umbrella organization for 39 associations from 24 European countries. At a conference in Bergen in 2004, the partners drafted a hotel classification system in order to harmonize their national standards. In 2007 HOTREC launched the European Hospitality Quality scheme (EHQ) which has since accredited the existing national inspection bodies for hotel rating.

Under the patronage of HOTREC, the hotel associations of Austria, Czech Republic, Germany, Hungary, Netherlands, Sweden and Switzerland created the Hotelstars Union. On 14 September 2009, the Hotelstars Union classification system was established at a conference in Prague. This system became effective in these countries in January 2010, with the exception of Hungary, Switzerland and the Netherlands, who have chosen later dates for the change. Later more countries have joined the HOTREC hotelstars system: Estonia (2011), Latvia (2011), Lithuania (2011), Luxembourg (2011), Malta (2012), Belgium (2013), Denmark (2013), Greece (2013), Liechtenstein (2015), Slovenia (2017), Azerbaijan (2020) and Georgia (2021).

The European Hotelstars Union system is based on the earlier German hotelstars system that had widely influenced the hotel classifications in central Europe, with five stars and a Superior mark to flag extras. Instead of a strict minimum in room size and required shower facilities (e.g. a bath tub in a four-star hotel) there is a catalogue of criteria with 7 qualification areas encompassing 247 elements, where some are mandatory for a star and others optional. The main criteria are in quality management, wellness and sleeping accommodation. In the catalogue of criteria each entry is associated with a number of points – each Hotelstars level requires a minimal sum of points besides some criteria being obligatory for the level. The minimum requirement for the Superior flag requires the same sum of points as for the next Hotelstars level which however was not awarded due to at least one obligatory requirement being left out.

For hotels with three to five stars, the Hotelstars Union will use "mystery guests" to check the service quality regularly.

World hotel rating 

There is so far no international classification which has been adopted. There have been attempts at unifying the classification system so that it becomes an internationally recognized and a reliable standard, but they have all failed.

It has been considered that, as it has been the case in other areas (e.g. international accounting standards), hotel classification standards should result from a private and independent initiative. This may be the case of the World Hotel Rating (WHR) project, which notably aims to set international classification standards and rating criteria along the lines of a world star-rating system. It will also establish an information platform on the hotel industry which will be multilingual and multicultural. WHR intends to play a key role in the development of quality hotel services, as well as equitable and sustainable tourism, and the protection of the world's cultural and natural heritage. In addition, WHR will develop labels to promote hotels distinguished by specific features, such as a family and child-friendly disposition. A test period was scheduled for 2010.

More than five stars 
Some hotels have been advertised as seven star hotels. The Burj Al Arab hotel in Dubai was opened in 1998 with a butler for every room – this has been the first hotel being widely described as a "seven-star" property, but the hotel says the label originates from an unnamed British journalist on a press trip and that they neither encourage its use nor do they use it in their advertising. Similarly the Emirates Palace Hotel in Abu Dhabi (open since 2005) is sometimes described as seven star as well, but the hotel uses only a five star rating.

The Galleria in Milan, Italy was opened in 2007 and it claims to have a seven star certificate from SGS Italy2008. However the SGS Italy (not the official tourism agency) only has five stars in the general hotel stars categorization, with the full title of the certificate being left unknown, just as the renewal process is unknown. Overall, as no traditional organization or formal body awards or recognizes any rating over five-star deluxe, such claims are predominantly used for advertising purposes.

Historically, luxury hotels have used the membership in The Leading Hotels of the World to document regular inspection on an additional level. This organization had been formed in 1928 and it reorganized in 1971 introducing a worldwide inspection service.

Alternative hotel ratings 
In recent years, alternative hotel ratings are starting to appear in an effort to promote sustainability or cultural diversity in international tourism.

Green Key International 
Green Key International is a voluntary eco-classification awarded to around 2,900 hotels and other establishments in 57 countries by the Foundation for Environmental Education.

Green Key Global 
Green Key Global is a voluntary eco-classification awarded to around 1,850 hotels and venues in 15 countries. In 2009, Fairmont Hotels & Resorts joined the Green Key Global program.

Green Globe 
Green Globe is a certification for sustainable tourism. Membership is reserved for companies and organizations who are committed to making positive contributions to the planet. The Green Building Initiative (GBI) acquired the U.S. rights to the Canadian Green Globes building assessment and certification for the program in 2004 and adapted it for the U.S. market.

Salam Standard 
Salam Standard is a classification system for Muslim-friendly hotels. Hotels can get certified based on certain Muslim-friendly criteria such as offering prayer mats, removing alcohol from the room and offering halal restaurant recommendations; it is divided into 4 tiers (bronze, silver, gold and platinum). Archipelago Hotels, Indonesia's biggest hospitality firm, is a prominent member of the Salam Standard system.

Guest Reviews 
The advancement of technology and internet connectivity has caused shifts in the way hotel guests book their accommodations. In the past, official hotel ratings were the primary factor in booking a hotel, but now, modern consumers also rely on the opinions of previous guests as expressed in online reviews. These reviews, based on personal experiences, have become increasingly important for other travellers when considering where to stay.  "In today’s world, consumers rely heavily on online information when making purchasing decisions, be it for a new smartphone or the next holiday resort. When shopping for an online accommodation product, more than half of European consumers said that they are influenced by online customer reviews and online ratings, while just one-fifth of consumers see themselves as insusceptible to such reviews and ratings. Two in five European consumers also regard star ratings as an influencing factor when booking hotel rooms, whereas for about one in three consumers, star ratings don’t play a role."

See also 

 Star (classification)
 AAA Five Diamond Award

References

External links 

 Forbes Travel Guide - official site
 Slate magazine article mentioning the phenomenon of seven star hotels
 Self-proclaimed list of 7 star hotels

Hotel terminology
Rating systems
Star ranking systems